Ogdensburg International Airport  is a public airport located in the town of Oswegatchie,  southeast of Ogdensburg, in St. Lawrence County, New York. It is owned by the Ogdensburg Bridge & Port Authority, which also owns and operates the Ogdensburg–Prescott International Bridge, Port of Ogdensburg-Marine Terminal Facility, Commerce Park, Port of Waddington, a medium-heavy industrial park and two short line railroads. The Ogdensburg Bridge and Port Authority is a New York State public-benefit corporation. The international airport is just outside the city limits on NY 812. It is used for general aviation and commercial service. Scheduled commercial flights are operated by one airline: Contour Airlines (service is subsidized by the Essential Air Service program). 

Federal Aviation Administration records say the airport had 603 passenger boardings (enplanements) in calendar year 2008, 2,329 in 2010, and 10,281 in 2016. The National Plan of Integrated Airport Systems for 2011–2015 categorized it as a general aviation airport (the commercial service category requires at least 2,500 enplanements per year).

Facilities
Ogdensburg International Airport covers 500 acres (202 ha) at an elevation of 297 feet (91 m). Its one runway, 9/27, was 5,200 by 150 feet (1,585 x 46 m) asphalt until the summer of 2016 when it was extended to 6,400 (1,951 m) by  length. In the year ending March 23, 2015 the airport had 1,508 aircraft operations, average 126 per month: 71% air taxi, 21% general aviation, and 8% military. Seven aircraft were then based at the airport, all single-engine. There are a handful of buildings: a small hangar, storage shed and fire hall.

Airlines and destinations

Passenger

Airline flights (Mohawk DC-3s) started in 1957 after the airport got a  paved runway.

A handful of tenants besides Skywest are at the airport:
 St. Lawrence Flying Club Incorporated – fixed wing and rotary flight training

Statistics

Annual traffic

See also
Other New York State airports that target Canadian travellers:

 Plattsburgh International Airport – alternative to Montreal (Dorval)
 Buffalo International Airport – alternative to airports in the Toronto/Golden Horseshoe (Toronto Pearson, Hamilton John C. Munro, Toronto Billy Bishop)
 Watertown International Airport – alternative to Ottawa and Kingston

References

Other sources

 Essential Air Service documents (Docket OST-1997-2842) from the U.S. Department of Transportation:
 Order 2005-5-8: reselects Mesa Air Group, Inc., d/b/a Air Midwest, to continue providing essential air service (EAS) at Massena, Ogdensburg and Watertown, New York, for a two-year period, and establishes an annual subsidy of $1,757,834 for service consisting of three round trips each weekday and three over the weekend period between the communities and Pittsburgh, with 19-seat Beech 1900D aircraft.
 Order 2006-12-22: selecting Big Sky Transportation Co., a wholly owned subsidiary of MAIR Holdings, Inc. d/b/a Big Sky Airlines, to provide essential air service (EAS) at Massena, Ogdensburg, and Watertown, New York, consisting of 18 weekly round trips, three each weekday and three each weekend, to Boston, with 19-seat Beech 1900D turboprop aircraft for the two-year period beginning on or about March 1, 2007, at a combined annual subsidy of $2,097,906.
 Order 2008-3-15: selecting Hyannis Air Service, Inc. d/b/a Cape Air, to provide subsidized essential air service (EAS) at Massena, Ogdensburg, and Watertown, New York, for the two-year period beginning when the carrier inaugurates full EAS pursuant to this Order, at a total annual subsidy of $3,879,863.
 Order 2011-1-6: selecting Hyannis Air Service, Inc. d/b/a Cape Air (Cape Air), to continue providing subsidized essential air service (EAS) at Massena (for two years), at the annual subsidy rate of $1,708,911, and at Ogdensburg (for four years), at the annual subsidy rate of $1,702,697, beginning when the carrier inaugurates the new service pattern.

External links
 Airport information at Ogdensburg Bridge and Port Authority website
  at New York State DOT website
 

Airports in New York (state)
Essential Air Service
Transportation buildings and structures in St. Lawrence County, New York
Transportation in St. Lawrence County, New York